Kathy Prendergast (born 1958), is an Irish sculptor, draftsman, and painter.

Life
Prendergast was born in 1958 in Dublin. She studied at Manor House School, Raheny, and pursued third level studies at the National College of Art & Design, graduating in 1983.

She then went to the Royal College of Art, London from 1983 to 1986.

She won the Best Young Artist Award in 1995 representing Ireland at the Venice Biennale, having first attended ten years earlier in Paris. Prendergast was also the inaugural recipient of the David and Yuko Juda Foundation Prize.

Prendergast is particularly known for her City Drawing project which she began in 1992. She detailed pencil maps of the world's capital cities, now the work is part of the permanent collection of the Irish Museum of Modern Art. Her work is held in galleries around the world.  She has lived in London since 1983. Prendergast is a member of Aosdána.

Exhibitions
 Unit 7 Gallery, London (1987)
 Douglas Hyde Gallery, Dublin
 Camden Arts Centre, London
 Memento Metropolis, Copenhagen (1996)
 Tate Gallery, London (1997)
 Robert Miller Gallery, New York (1998)
 Irish Museum of Modern Art (1999)

References

Sources
 
 
 
 
 
 
 
 
 

1958 births
Living people
Artists from Dublin (city)
People educated at Manor House School, Raheny
20th-century Irish women artists
21st-century Irish women artists
Alumni of the National College of Art and Design
Alumni of the Royal College of Art
Irish contemporary artists